Saint-Pierre-en-Antioche Church is a Catholic church located in the village of Ascq, now part of the commune of Villeneuve-d'Ascq, Nord department, northern France.

The church contains a tapestry designated as a monument historique in 1906, called Les Noces de Cana (Marriage at Cana), painted by A. Werniers in 1735. It was originally part of a collection of six pieces for Saint Sauveur church.

References

Churches in Nord (French department)
Buildings and structures in Villeneuve-d'Ascq
Churches completed in 1842
19th-century Roman Catholic church buildings in France
Roman Catholic churches completed in 1932